Yates City is a village in Knox County, Illinois, United States. The population was 642 at the 2020 census. It is part of the Galesburg Micropolitan Statistical Area.

History
Yates City was named after Yates County, New York.

Clinton L. Ewing (1879–1953), Illinois state legislator, businessman, and farmer; was born in Yates City.

Owen B. West (1869–1948), Illinois state legislator, businessman and farmer; served as mayor of Yates City.

Lewis E. Jones (1865 - 1936), Hymnal song writer

Notable Athlete
Bradley Wrage, a Yates City native, went on to place 4th place in the 2012 State Farm MVC Outdoor Track & Field Championships clocking in at 9:14.31. Yates City hosted a celebration for Bradley's feat with a 1.5 Mile parade of Tractors.

Geography
Yates City is in southeastern Knox County at  (40.778143, -90.015280). Illinois Route 8 passes through the center of the village, leading east  to Elmwood and west  to Illinois Route 97 near Maquon.

Demographics

As of the census of 2000, there were 725 people, 299 households, and 209 families residing in the village. The racial makeup of the village was 98.90% White, 0.41% African American, 0.14% Native American, 0.28% from other races, and 0.28% from two or more races.

There were 299 households, out of which 28.8% had children under the age of 18 living with them, 61.2% were married couples living together, 6.7% had a female householder with no husband present, and 30.1% were non-families. 27.8% of all households were made up of individuals, and 16.1% had someone living alone who was 65 years of age or older. The average household size was 2.42 and the average family size was 2.95.

In the village, the population was spread out, with 23.9% under the age of 18, 7.6% from 18 to 24, 28.1% from 25 to 44, 22.1% from 45 to 64, and 18.3% who were 65 years of age or older. The median age was 38 years. For every 100 females, there were 103.7 males. For every 100 females age 18 and over, there were 95.1 males.

The median income for a household in the village was $37,344, and the median income for a family was $42,679. Males had a median income of $33,625 versus $20,956 for females. The per capita income for the village was $18,036. About 6.0% of families and 8.5% of the population were below the poverty line, including 12.1% of those under age 18 and 11.7% of those age 65 or over.

References

Villages in Knox County, Illinois
Villages in Illinois
Galesburg, Illinois micropolitan area